Christopher Comstock (born May 19, 1992), known professionally as Marshmello, is an American electronic music producer and DJ. His songs "Silence", "Wolves", "Friends", "Happier", and "Alone" have been certified multi-platinum in several countries and appeared in the Top 30 of the Billboard Hot 100. His musical style includes groove-oriented, synth and bass-heavy electronic dance music. He is managed by Moe Shalizi.

Marshmello first gained international recognition in early 2015 by publishing remixes online. His debut studio album, Joytime, was released in January 2016, which included the lead single and Marshmello's debut single "Keep It Mello". "Alone", a platinum-certified single was released in May 2016 via the Canadian record label Monstercat. Having peaked on the US Billboard Hot 100 at number 60, it became his first single to be certified platinum in the US and Canada with over 1 million copies of certified units. That year, he released three subsequent singles. In 2017, after releasing singles such as "Chasing Colors", "Twinbow" and "Moving On", Marshmello collaborated with American R&B singer Khalid to release "Silence" as a single, which was certified platinum and multi-platinum in eight countries. Succeeding another single, one of his bestselling singles, a collaboration with American singer Selena Gomez, titled "Wolves" was released.

In 2018, he released "Friends", a collaboration with British singer Anne-Marie. Months later, his second studio album, Joytime II, was released with singles "Tell Me" and "Check This Out". "Happier", a collaboration with British band Bastille, was released in August and became his highest-charting song on the Billboard Hot 100 at #2. In 2019, he earned $40 million, ranking second on the list of highest paid DJs compiled by Forbes. In 2020, he and American rapper Juice Wrld released "Come & Go", from the latter's posthumous album Legends Never Die; the song reached number two on the Billboard Hot 100, matching "Happier" as his highest-charting song. In 2021, his album Shockwave earned him a Grammy nomination.

Marshmello wears a custom white helmet, resembling a marshmallow, for public appearances and in his music videos. His identity was initially a secret, but was confirmed by Forbes to be Chris Comstock in April 2017.

Career

2015–2016: Early career and Joytime
Marshmello posted his first original song "Wavez" to his SoundCloud page in the early months of 2015. In June 2015, he released remixes of songs by American DJ duo Jack Ü and Russian-German DJ Zedd. As he released more songs, he began to receive support from musicians such as Skrillex, who reposted his song "Find Me" on SoundCloud. In late 2015, he made performances at New York's Pier 94,  Pomona, California's HARD Day of the Dead festival, and in March 2016, he performed at Miami Music Week.

On January 8, 2016, via his label Joytime Collective, Marshmello released his debut studio album Joytime, consisting of 10 songs. One single was released from the album, titled "Keep It Mello", featuring Mexican rapper Omar Linx, and was certified gold by the Recording Industry Association of America (RIAA). The album peaked at number five on Billboard's Dance/Electronic Songs chart, number fourteen on the US Heatseeker Albums chart and forty-one on the Independent Albums chart.

Marshmello debuted on Monstercat, a Canadian independent record label, with the release of "Alone", which appeared on the label's compilation album Monstercat 027 – Cataclysm. The song became his first to debut on the Billboard Hot 100, peaking at 60th and charting on the Dance/Electronic Songs chart at ninth and the Canadian Hot 100 at 56th, which was also his first in Canada. It was also certified platinum in both Canada by Music Canada and the United States by RIAA.

2016–2018: "Silence", "Wolves", "Friends", and Joytime II

By May 2016, although his identity was unknown, Marshmello was frequently suggested to be Chris Comstock, an American DJ who was known as Dotcom at the time.

On June 19, 2016, Marshmello performed at Electric Daisy Carnival in Las Vegas. In a gimmick attempted by Marshmello and Dutch DJ Tiësto, the latter who wore the same clothes as the former on stage, took off his helmet presenting himself as Marshmello. It was later regarded as a publicity stunt by fans and the media due to their conflicting tour dates and a photo of "the two helmeted DJs hanging out together pre-show".

He announced the Ritual Tour on Twitter, in which he performed in several countries including the United States, China, South Korea, India and Paraguay from late September until early January of the following year. The tour was accompanied with his debut on dubstep musician Skrillex's Owsla label, with a single titled "Ritual", in which vocalist Wrabel was featured. An official music video for the song was published to YouTube. Soon after, Marshmello launched his own record label named Joytime Collective and recruited fellow DJ and producer Slushii as the first signee on its roster.

Marshmello collaborated with Ookay to release the single "Chasing Colors", featuring vocals by American singer Noah Cyrus. He later collaborated with Slushii to release the single "Twinbow", a song previously only known to the public as a snippet. During the mid-year, his third single of the year titled "Moving On" was released, having debuted two years before receiving the official release. A music video for the song was also published, having received 169 million views as of December 2018. Months later, Marshmello announced upcoming collaborations with American hip hop recording artist Blackbear and Demi Lovato. The collaborations, however, were never released officially as of December 2018. Following that, Marshmello released "Love U" as a single for free as appreciation to his fans. The song was described by Billboard as a "gritty dance-pop single with a pounding bass line and helium-breathed vocals."

His next single, announced on Twitter, was a collaboration with American R&B singer Khalid titled "Silence", which was released on August 11, 2017, via RCA Records. The song appeared on the Top 200 in over 28 countries. It topped the Dance charts in Australia, the United Kingdom, and the United States, and charted in the Top 10 of more than fifteen countries such as Germany, Sweden and Norway. It also appeared on the year-end charts of Hungary, Denmark, Austria, Belgium, and the Netherlands. Additionally, it was certified multi-platinum in many countries. Among them were platinum by BPI (United Kingdom) and BM (Germany), double platinum by BEA (Belgium), RMNZ (New Zealand) and RIAA (United States), triple platinum by MC (Canada), a quadruple platinum by SRIA (Sweden) and a quintuple platinum by ARIA (Australia).

Later in the year, he released his collaboration with American singer Selena Gomez, the single "Wolves" which became a commercial success, having reached the top 10 in more than 20 countries. It topped the charts in Latvia, Poland and Hungary, and the Billboard Dance/Electronic Songs chart. It was also his highest-charting Billboard Hot 100 song in 2017, having peaked in the Top 50 of over 50 countries and sold over 2.5 million copies of certified units. The song was certified gold in the United Kingdom, Germany, Portugal and Denmark, and multiple-platinum in Brazil, Sweden, Canada, and Australia while receiving single-platinum certification in the United States, France, Italy, Spain, Belgium and New Zealand.

Succeeding "Wolves", the single "You & Me" was released through Joytime Collective, accompanied by an animated music video which was produced and directed by Toon53. The video was published three weeks after the song's release, on his YouTube channel, receiving over 42 million views as of December 2018.

In November, Forbes published an article confirming Christopher Comstock as the individual behind the Marshmello project, with regards to existing proofs such as his real name being revealed in music royalty manager BMI's database and that Marshmello's company was registered in August 2015 under Comstock in Delaware. Furthermore, it was also disclosed to Forbes by industry insiders that the two are the same person. Previously known pieces of evidence such as the ASCAP credit, their physical and musical similarities, and Skrillex addressing Marshmello as "Chris" were taken into account of confirming Marshmello's identity.

In January 2018, Marshmello released a posthumous collaboration with rapper Lil Peep, titled "Spotlight". He decided to release the single only after speaking to Peep's mother, who had requested her son's unpublished musical work to be released as much as possible. A month later, Marshmello worked with frequent collaborator Slushii for the song "There ×2", which was released as a single.

He released a collaboration with British singer Anne-Marie named "Friends", as the fifth single from Anne-Marie's debut studio album, Speak Your Mind. The song became his highest-charting song on the Hot 100 until October 2018, peaking at number eleven. It also received a single-platinum certification in Belgium, Germany, New Zealand, the United Kingdom, and the United States alongside receiving an Australian double-platinum and a Canadian triple-platinum certification.

Among the other singles released after the work with Anne-Marie were a song with rapper Logic titled "Everyday", which was released as the third single from his seventh mixtape, Bobby Tarantino II, "Fly" and "You Can Cry", a collaborative single with rapper Juicy J and British soul singer James Arthur. On June 19, Marshmello announced on Twitter his second studio album titled Joytime II, which would be musically similar to its predecessor. The album was released on June 22, 2018. Rolling Stone described it as monotonous and Marshmello's decision to not feature guests as disappointing, stating "every song sounds like it has already been pre-leased for use by energy-drink companies or extreme-sports squads." The album was given a 'one-and-a-half star' rating by the magazine, while Pitchfork gave the album a 4.2 out of 10 rating. Two singles were released off the album in June, titled "Tell Me" and "Check This Out", the latter of which receiving an official music video published several months later.

2018–present: "Happier", Joytime III and Shockwave

In August 2018, he collaborated with British band Bastille to release a single titled "Happier" in August. It became his highest-charting song in Canada, Sweden, the United Kingdom, and the United States, while becoming his third number-one song on the Dance/Electronic Songs chart, where it spent a record 69 weeks at the top. The song was certified gold in Belgium, Sweden, and the United Kingdom, platinum in New Zealand and the United States, and double-platinum in Australia and Canada. His subsequent singles, collaborations with Egyptian singer-songwriter Amr Diab titled "Bayen Habeit" and American rapper and producer Roddy Ricch titled "Project Dreams", were released in December.

In January 2019, Marshmello collaborated with the free-to-play video game Fortnite Battle Royale to throw an in-game concert, along with releasing merchandise based on the game. On February 2 and 3, the concert was held online, amassing over 10 million players on the first day. During the first quarter of 2019 he released various collaboration. The first, in February, was a collaboration with dubstep producer Svdden Death titled "Sell Out". The second was with Scottish band Chvrches, called "Here with Me". Finally, in April, he released Roll the Dice, an extended play with California rappers SOB X RBE. It contains three songs: "Roll the Dice", "Don't Save Me" and "First Place".

In June 2019, he released "Rescue Me", a collaboration with American rock band A Day to Remember as the first single from his third album, Joytime III. On November 13, Marshmello collaborated with Blackbear and Yungblud to release "Tongue Tied".

On May 1, 2020, Marshmello then collaborated with Halsey to release "Be Kind". In July 2020, Marshmello appeared on rapper Juice WRLD's posthumous album Legends Never Die, on the tracks "Come & Go" and "Hate the Other Side", which reached numbers two and ten on the Billboard Hot 100, respectively, with the former matching "Happier" as his highest-charting song.

In May 2021, Marshmello headlined the opening ceremony of the 2021 UEFA Champions League Final.

On June 11, 2021, Marshmello released his fourth studio album, Shockwave. It was independently released by the producer's own Joytime Collective label. On November 23, 2021, the album was announced as a nominee for the Grammy Award for Best Dance/Electronic Album, earning Marshmello his first Grammy nomination.

In 2022, Marshmello collaborated with Coca-Cola to create a limited edition flavour under their 'Coca-Cola Creations' brand; the strawberry and watermelon-flavoured drink was packaged in cans paying homage to "Marshmello's signature aesthetic."

Artistry

Marshmello wears a custom white helmet, resembling a marshmallow, for public appearances and in his music videos. His identity was initially a secret, but was confirmed by Forbes to be Chris Comstock in April 2017, citing events such as Skrillex's referring of Marshmello as "Chris" in an interview, the managerial connection of Shalizi, and the similar tattoos and birthday. Marshmello is a fan of Daft Punk, which are similar to him. On July 2, 2019, Marshmello released a documentary with More Than Music (Artist Spotlight Series) on YouTube. In the documentary, Shalizi describes the process and effort into creating the Marshmello brand.

His stage name, an alternative spelling of "marshmallow", and his marshmallow mascot head were both inspired by Canadian electronic music producer Deadmau5, who also uses an alternate spelling for his stage name and performs wearing a "dead mouse" mascot head. Acknowledgement of Deadmau5's contribution to Marshmello's persona is evident in the music video for "Alone".

As a YouTuber, Marshmello has published gaming and cooking videos for his series "Gaming with Marshmello" and "Cooking with Marshmello". In an episode of the latter, American singer Paula Abdul was featured as a guest. In the cooking series, Marshmello was shown presenting his methods of cooking, for foods such as meals, snacks and desserts. Appearing as non-speaker, he used body language to express himself in the videos.

Philanthropy
Marshmello, together with Fortnite player Tyler "Ninja" Blevins, have won prize money of $1 million  from Epic Games's E3 Celebrity Pro Am charity tournament, half of which was donated to KIND (Kids in Need of Defense), an organization providing legal counsel to refugees and immigrant children. With the single "Happier" and its pet-dog-themed video, he supported the #FindYourFido campaign by American Society for the Prevention of Cruelty to Animals (ASPCA) in October 2018, also recognized as "Adopt a Shelter Dog" month.

Discography

 Joytime (2016)
 Joytime II (2018)
 Joytime III (2019)
 Shockwave (2021)

Awards and nominations

Marshmello has been awarded Best Electronic at the 2018 MTV Europe Music Awards, his first major award win. Marshmello received nominations for works such as "Alone", "Wolves", "Silence" and "Friends".

Billboard Music Awards

DJ Magazine's top 100 DJs

Electronic Music Awards

iHeartRadio Music Awards

iHeartRadio Titanium Awards

International Dance Music Awards

MTV Europe Music Awards

MTV Woodies

Radio Disney Music Awards

Remix Awards

Teen Choice Awards

WDM Radio Awards

References

1992 births
Living people
American DJs
American electronic musicians
American TikTokers
Astralwerks artists
Celebrities who have won professional wrestling championships
Club DJs
Electronic dance music DJs
Future bass musicians
Geffen Records artists
Masked musicians
Monstercat artists
Musicians from Philadelphia
Owsla artists
Progressive house musicians
Record producers from Pennsylvania
Republic Records artists
Shipley School alumni
WWE 24/7 Champions
Music-related YouTube channels